Jay Chou (born January 18, 1979) is a Taiwanese singer, songwriter, record producer, rapper, actor, and television personality. Dubbed the "King of Mandopop", and having sold over 30 million records, Chou is one of the best-selling artists in Taiwan and is known for his work with lyricist Vincent Fang, with whom he has frequently collaborated on his music.

In 2000, Chou released his debut studio album, Jay (2000), under the record company Alfa Music. Chou rose to fame with the release of his second studio album, Fantasy (范特西) (2001), which combined Western and Eastern music styles. The album won five Golden Melody Awards, including Album of the Year. He has since further released twelve more studio albums, spawning a string of hit singles and gaining significant prominence in Asian communities such as Taiwan, Hong Kong SAR,  China Mainland, Malaysia, and Singapore. Chou has embarked on six world tours, performing in cities around the world to more than 10 million spectators as of 2019.

In 2007, Chou established his own record and management company JVR Music. Outside of music, Chou has served as the President of his own fashion brand PHANTACi since 2006. As an actor, Chou made his acting debut in the film Initial D 頭文字D(2005), followed shortly by a starring role in the epic Curse of the Golden Flower (2006). He has since starred in a number of movies, becoming known to Western audiences when he made his Hollywood debut in 2011 with The Green Hornet, starring alongside Seth Rogen and Christoph Waltz, followed by Now You See Me 2 (2016).

Early life 
Jay Chou (Chou Chieh-lun) was born and raised in Taipei, Taiwan. Both his parents were secondary school teachers: his mother, Yeh Hui-Mei, who was an art teacher who taught fine arts, while his father, Chou Yao-Chung, is a biomedical researcher. His mother noticed his sensitivity to music and took him to piano lessons at the age of four. During his childhood, he was fascinated with capturing sounds and songs with his tape recorder, which he carried everywhere with him. In the third grade, he became interested in music theory and also started cello lessons. He was an only child and loved to play piano, imitate TV actors, and perform magic tricks. His favorite composer was, and is still to this day, Chopin. Jay graduated from Taipei Jinhua High School.  His parents divorced when he was 14 and he was teased by his classmates, which caused him to become reclusive and introverted. He had no friends and preferred to be alone, listening to music, contemplating and daydreaming. At , he majored in piano and minored in cello. He showed a talent for improvisation, became fond of pop music, and began to write songs.

Chou was conscripted for mandatory military service after graduating from high school with inadequate grades for university. However, severe back pain triggered by sports eventually led to the diagnosis of ankylosing spondylitis (HLA-B27), and he was exempted from military service. Meanwhile, he found a job as a waiter.

Early career 
Chou's mother initially inspired Chou to become a music teacher, while Chou remained relatively clueless on what to do with his life. Without his knowledge, a friend registered both their names in a talent show called Super New Talent King in 1998. Chou played the piano accompaniment for his friend, whose singing was described as "lousy". Although they did not win, the show's host, Jacky Wu – an influential character in Taiwan's entertainment business – happened to glance at the music score and was impressed with its complexity. Wu then asked who wrote it, discovered Chou and hired him as a contract composer and paired him with the novice lyricist Vincent Fang. for his then record company, Alfa Music. Chou then spent most of his time in Wu's studio learning music producing, sound mixing, recording, and writing songs. Although he was trained in classical music, Chou combines Chinese and Western music styles to produce songs that fuse R&B, rock and pop genres. However, Wu told Chou that he would help Chou release an album after he wrote 50 songs and he would pick 10 from there. Chou already had an arsenal of songs he wrote for others but had been rejected, so among those he chose 10 for his debut CD album, Jay, released in 2000. The album established his reputation as a musically gifted singer-songwriter whose style is a fusion of R&B, rap, classical music, and yet distinctly Chinese. His fame spread quickly in Chinese-speaking regions throughout Southeast Asia.

Music career

2000 to 2003 

In 2000, under the recommendation of JR Yang (楊峻榮), Jay Chou began to sing his own songs.  Chou launched his debut album Jay under Alfa Music in 2000. Chou arranged the compilation, harmony, and production of all the songs. The album combines R&B, hip-hop, and other musical styles. Among them, the hit song "星晴" won the 24th China Top Ten Chinese Gold Songs.  The album was promoted heavily by Jacky Wu in the entertainment shows he hosted. Chou himself also appeared on a few television programs to promote the album. Chou was marketed as a talented singer-composer with a unique tune. His collaboration with Vincent Fang and Vivian Hsu on the release brought about a few hits.

After promoting his debut album, Chou returned to the studio for the next twelve months to record and produce his next album, 范特西Fantasy, which helped him become an established star. This album was released in September 2001 and became a big hit, selling an estimated two million copies in Taiwan alone. Fantasy helped Chou secure ten nominations and five wins at the 13th Golden Melody Awards in 2002. R&B hits such as "簡單愛" (Simple Love) "愛在西元前" (Love before BC), which won Chou the Best Composer award, and "開不了口" (Can't Express Myself) are considered Chou's signature songs and are still sung in concerts today.

Chou's music has been a much-discussed topic across Chinese regions because it differed greatly from mainstream popular Chinese music released at that time. His pieces combine ancient themes with futuristic ones, including things like space ships, all while employing graphic storytelling skills to evoke vivid imagery to his audience. His enunciation, or lack thereof, whether rapping or singing, was also critiqued when listeners often found that they could not decipher the words sung until they looked up the lyrics. Critics referred to his singing as "mumbling". This garnered a lot of attention and reporters often quiz Chou on his singing style. Chou defended this as his signature style to infuse the vocals with the music and "make it blend" well together. Chou also stated that he wants the listeners to look at the lyrics stating the lyrics written by Vincent Fang are very deep.

Chou's third album, The Eight Dimensions八度空间, became another commercial success and is similar in style to his second. Another collaboration with Fang, The Eight Dimensions八度空间 included songs that invoke imagery, Chou's "mumbling" style, and mainly R&B tunes. The singer has sold over 750,000 copies of Fantasy as of 2002, throughout the region. In the same year, Chou held his debut concert tour The One. There was also more crossover activity between Malaysia and Indonesia, as well as steadily increasing activity by Japanese acts in the region.

2003 to 2005 
In 2003, Chou released his fourth album Yeh Hui-mei named after his own mother. After the release of this album, he attended the Golden Melody Awards for his previous album's nomination. The album The Eight Dimensions was nominated for 5 categories but won none. Chou didn't take this too lightly, as he wrote on his next album the song "外婆" (Grandmother) that he actually takes the Golden Melody Awards too seriously. Ironically, his then-current album Yeh Hui-mei would go on to win a Golden Melody  "Best Album of the year " award in 2004.

Yeh Hui-mei was both a commercial and musical success. The album features songs on Mafia and drug lords "以父之名" (In the name of the father) which at first hearing was very unorthodox but displays Jay's creative writing and producing ability. This album can be seen as Jay's second milestone because it gained an extremely positive reaction from both critics and supporters of his music. Jay also wanted to prove that he is a versatile artist and does not only write R&B songs, but he also ventured into more rock-flavored tunes such as "晴天" which was one of the most played songs of the year. This song gained widespread popularity and high school students started learning guitar to play the drift of the song's intro.

In 2004, his album 七里香 Common Jasmin Orange, released by Sony Music, excelled in Taiwan, Hong Kong and China Mainland. Despite overwhelming piracy in Taiwan-which has reduced the recording industry to 5 to 10 percent from its heyday-as a Taiwan singer, Jay produced an album that sold a record 300,000 copies. In Hong Kong, his album surpassed local albums with sales of 50,000 units. In China the official figure reached 2.6 million units, a figure no other Chinese artist has attained. The World Music Awards in September 2004 held in Las Vegas acknowledged him as the most popular Chinese singer based on sales.

In 2005, his album 11月的蕭邦Chopin of November continued this record of success with sales of 2.5 million units in Asia.

Single released in 2018 
He published his new single 'Waiting For You'. He released the song on his birthday, January 18. The content is about a young man who secretly fell in love with a girl. He regretted that he didn't study well and couldn't enter the same university with her. In order to wait for her to finish class, he rented a house near the girl's residence, waited for her silently, played the piano and wrote a love letter. He just wanted to convey his mind to her, but he couldn't find the time and way. He had to wait for the girl to finish class every day.

Single released in 2019 
He recently made his chart comeback after a three-year hiatus with his long-awaited new single "Won't cry". The song, which features Mayday vocalist, Ashin, was released on 16 September 2019, and its music video has since been viewed over 22 million times on YouTube.

In fact, the song was streamed so many times that it was reported to have caused QQ music – China's biggest streaming platform – to crash on the day of its release.

Single released in 2020 
He published his new single "Mojito". It caused a sensation on the Internet. The song, which effuses amorous feelings of Cuba, was released as a single album on June 12, 2020.

Musical style 
Chou's compositions are loosely categorized as pop music. While many of his works fall into contemporary R&B, rap, and rock genres, the term "Chou Style" has been popularized to describe his trademark cross-cultural music and insistence on singing with slurred enunciation. The Taipei Times once described the meaning of "Chou Style": "In what has become the archetypal Chou style, Taiwan's favorite son blends pop, rap, blues and a smorgasbord of esthetic elements of world music to create his dream-like never-never land..."

Chou regularly fuses traditional Chinese instruments and styles with R&B or rock to form a new genre called "Zhongguo feng", which literally means "Chinese Style Music", some of which are written in the Pentatonic Scale as opposed to the more common seven-note scale (Diatonic scale) to accentuate an oriental style. Chou's most popular songs all contain some elements of Chinese culture. Besides his own culture and Chinese culture, he also incorporated Spanish guitar in "Red Imitation", American techno/electronica in "Herbalist's Manual", rap with subtle classical music undertones in "Reverse Scales", Blues style in "Free Tutorial Video" and Bossanova style in "Rosemary", to name a few. Sound effects from everyday life are frequently woven into his music, such as bouncing ping pong balls, touch tone phone dialing, helicopter blades, dripping rain, and radio static noise (Musique concrète).

His formal musical training is evident by the use of classical textures in his compositions. For example, counterpoint was used in "Perfection" and "Sorry", while polyphony can be found in "The Wound That Ends War" and "Twilight's Chapter Seven".

Chou's albums have been noted for the lack of change compared to his earlier works, yet he firmly stated that he will not alter his style: "They say I've been standing still ... but this is the music I want, and I don't see what I want by moving ahead." To demonstrate his point, he named his 2006 album 依然范特西 Still Fantasy after his 2001 album Fantasy. His use of relaxed enunciation has been criticized as "mumbling" which he also insisted will not change; however, recently he has adopted clearer pronunciation for certain songs, particularly more traditional Chinese style songs, such as "Faraway" which features Fei Yu-ching and "Chrysanthemum Terrace".

Lyrics 
Chou is considered more of a singer-composer than a lyricist. Several "regulars" write the lyrics for most of his music, but the content and style is unified with his own personality and image, covering a diverse range of topics and ideas. Vincent Fang accounts for more than half of the lyrics in his albums, helping to establish an important element in Chou's music: the use of meaningful, imagery- and emotionally rich lyrics, sometimes written in the form of ancient Chinese poetry with reference to Chinese history or folklore. In addition to writing romantic hits, he also touches on war, the Bible, sports, and martial arts. Vivian Hsu is a singer herself and has helped with Chou's earlier hits.

Chou himself has written lyrics for many ballads, but has also discussed societal ills such as drug addiction in "Coward" and loss of the rural countryside to urbanization in "Terrace fields". Domestic violence discussed in "Dad, I am back" received a great deal of commotion since he was the first to bring up this taboo subject in Sanscript music.

"In the Name of Father" detailing the cruelty and brutality of the violence, this song is not Jay's personal experience. Jay describes the phenomenon of domestic violence in society, and wants to appeal the public pay more attention to domestic violence.

Chinese cultural elements 
  
Chou leads a new trend of music which combines western musical elements and Chinese literature terms. Because of this unique combination, he makes distinction between himself and other musicians by leading a "Zhongguo feng" in Asian music history. The success of his Western-Chinese musical combination is built on his marketing strategies and the musical elements involved in his works.

In early 21st century, the People's Republic of China was in an economic transition model. The new generation was looking for a consumption pop culture which would reflect individual uniqueness in the social circumstance.

Chou has successfully generated airtime on CCTV by fitting in with the mainland's political and cultural agenda and celebrating traditional Chinese values.

The traditional Chinese cultural elements involved in Chou's music contribute to his status in Asian popular music culture. The blowing "Chinese style" (中國風) in his music leads a new trend of Chinese pop music that involves a vast amount of traditional Chinese components, rather than simply following Western music format. Chou's Zhongguo feng is highlighted in his lyrics and the use of traditional musical instruments in his music. Lyricist Vincent Fang has worked with Jay Chou since 2000. Fang's work is featured by addressing Chinese traditional elements, such as poetry and Confucianism. His representative work "Chrysanthemum Terrace", released in 2006, shows a vast amount of cultural elements. In this work, Fang puts images which indicate certain traditional ideas to build an ancient monarchy setting. He uses chrysanthemum as a metaphor of love. In the line "Chrysanthemums broken, scattered across the floor, your smile has faded", as well with "Blue and White Porcelain" (Chinese: 青花瓷) and "Orchid Pavilion" (Chinese: 蘭亭序).

Chou performs in a rhythm and blues style, but within this western form, he has inserted Chinese melodies, themes, and rhythms. His 2003 song "East Wind Breaks" (Chinese: 东风破; Dong Feng Po) features a typical Chinese melody performed in R&B style; its instrumentation also creates a Chinese atmosphere with the pipa (琵琶). In the lyrics, Chou expresses sadness and loneliness subtly, similar to traditional Chinese poetry.

Chou also uses traditional musical instruments, combining traditional Chinese elements of music with Western pop.

Collaborations 
Chou's career started as a songwriter for other singers, a practice he would continue even after starting his own successful singing career. He frequently composed for Jolin Tsai and Landy Wen, and occasionally for other singers like Coco Lee, S.H.E, Vivian Hsu, Fish Leong, Evonne Hsu, A-Mei, Selina Ren, Leehom Wang, Will Liu, Will Pan, Show Lo, Valen Hsu, and Hong Kong pop stars Edmond Leung, Twins, TPE48, Jordan Chan, Edison Chen, Karen Mok, Leo Ku, Gigi Leung, Eason Chan, and Joey Yung, as well as a one-time collaboration with Howard Su. He has also written for singers outside of his generation — over one dozen songs for his mentor Jacky Wu, Taiwanese singer Jody Chiang, and Hong Kong singers Jacky Cheung, Andy Lau, Aaron Kwok, and Kenny Bee.

He started the band Nan Quan Mama (南拳媽媽) in 2004, selecting band members and overseeing their album production. The group has been noted for sounding too similar to their mentor; as a result, Chou has reduced his involvement in the band, though he continues to increase their exposure by inviting them as guests performers for his concerts and music videos.

He has performed live duets with Landy Wen, Jolin Tsai, and former girlfriend and news anchor Patty Hou, but only two studio recordings of duets have been officially placed in his albums: "Coral Sea" in 2005 with Lara Veronin (of Nan Quan Mama) and "Faraway" in 2006 featuring Fei Yu-ching.
On 9 July 2001, songwriters Jay and Yungai Hayung (溫嵐) performed "The Roof"(屋頂), which was included in the album "A Little Wild" (《有點野》) by Yungai Hayung.
In 2016, Jay and A Mei (張惠妹) sang "Shouldn't Be" (不該), which was included in Jay Chou's 2016 album "Jay Chou's Bedtime Stories" (《周杰倫的床邊故事》). The song won the 2016 Top 20 Golden Melody Awards in the Global Pop Music Gold List.
On 18 January 2018, he released the duet "Waiting for You" (等你下課) with Gary Yang (楊瑞代).

Not including singers, Chou's longest-running collaboration is with lyricist Vincent Fang, as they both started their music career in 1998. The compilation album Partners featured 12 songs, each consisting of Chou's musical and Fang's lyrical compositions. Fang has written the words to more than 40 of Chou's songs, was the chief editor of Chou's book Grandeur de D Major, and is now Chou's business partner (together with Chou's manager JR Yang) for the record company JVR Music.

Jay Chou has also featured in Cindy Yen's (袁詠琳) song "Sand Painting" (畫沙) released in October 2009.

Jay Chou collaborated with Kobe Bryant on "The Heaven and Earth Challenge" (天地一鬥) to "promote youth creativity, as well as an upcoming slam-dunk competition in China." The song was released at a press conference before the NBA All-Star Game on 20 February 2011.

World tours 

Jay held his first series of five solo concerts, titled Fantasy Concert (范特西演唱會), with the first stop on 11 January 2001 at Taoyuan Arena, Taiwan. Followed by two shows at the Hong Kong Coliseum, one in Malaysia and ended in Singapore on 10 February 2002. His second concert tour, The One Concert (The One 演唱會) commenced on 28 September 2002 at Taipei Municipal Stadium, followed by 11 stops and ended at Shenzhen Stadium, China on 3 January 2004.
Two more series of world tours followed: Incomparable Concert (無與倫比演唱會) in 2004 and Jay Chou 2007, Las Vegas, Toronto and Vancouver.
In 2010, to celebrate Jay's 10-year career in the entertainment industry, he embarked on his fifth series of concert tour titled, New Era World Tour (超時代演唱會), with the first stop of three concerts from 11 to 13 June 2010 at Taipei Arena, followed by 40 stops ending from 17 to 18 December 2011 at Kaohsiung Arena.

He has kicked off his World Tour, "Opus Jay World Tour" starting with Shanghai as its first stop from 17 to 19 May 2013. Due to the success of his "Opus Jay World Tour" concerts, Jay Chou announced a sequel to the concert, titled "Opus II Jay World Tour". The first stop of this new world tour opened in the same city as its preceding world tour (Shanghai) on 2 May 2014, with more stops opening in same destinations. His seventh World Tour, "The Invincible Concert Tour" also held its first concert stop in Shanghai on 30 June 2016, and ending in December 2017. Similar to his previous World Tour, "The Invincible 2 Concert Tour" also had a sequel that had its first stop in Singapore on 6 January 2018.

To celebrate his 20th year in the entertainment industry, the eight World Tour "20 Carnival World Tour" held its first concert in Shanghai on 17 October 2019, with more stops to be announced.

World tours/Live (DVD) album releases

 2001 – Fantasy Concert (范特西演唱會)
 2002 – The One Concert (The One 演唱會) – Jay Chou The One Concert Live
 2004 – Incomparable Concert (無與倫比演唱會) – Jay Chou 2004 Incomparable Concert
 2007 – Jay Chou World Tours (世界巡迴演唱會) – Jay Chou 2007 the World Tours Concert Live
 2010 – New Era World Tour (超時代演唱會) – Jay Chou 2010 The Era World Tours Concert Live
 2013 – Opus Jay World Tour Concert Live (魔天倫演唱會) – Jay Chou 2013 Opus Jay World Tours Concert Live
 2016 – The Invincible Concert Tour (地表最強 世界巡迴演唱會) - Jay Chou The Invincible Concert Tour
 2019/2022/2023 – Jay Chou Carnival World Tour (嘉年华 世界巡回演唱会)

Movie career 
Chou formally entered the film industry in 2005 with the release of the movie Initial D (頭文字Ｄ). He has since acted in three other movies, directed one film and more than a dozen music videos. Chou, who once said "I live because of music", ventured into movies because he felt the need for a new challenge. As fans have grown concerned that movies will compromise his music career, Chou has repeatedly reassured that movies are a source of inspiration and not a distraction; at the same time, he realizes the need to balance both careers and maintain his place in the music field to garner the continued support of fans.

Acting 

Entry into acting was an unexpected move for Chou. His high school English teacher thought he was capable of very few facial expressions, and the director of Hidden Track (2003, a movie in which Chou had a cameo role) said that his strong individualistic personality will not make him a good actor. In 2005, Chou's first role as the lead actor in 头文字D Initial D served two purposes: to launch his acting debut, and to increase his exposure to Japanese audiences. This film is based on the Japanese comic Initial D, where Chou played Takumi Fujiwara, a gifted touge racer who is quiet and rarely shows expression. Some reviewers criticized his bland acting while others felt he performed naturally, but only because the character's personality closely mirrored his own. His performance in Initial D won him Best Newcomer Actor in Golden Horse Awards and Hong Kong Film Awards. Chou's second film was Curse of the Golden Flower (2006). As a supporting character, he drew much of the attention of Chinese reporters; Chou's involvement in this movie was announced in its own press conference, separate from the meeting held for Chow Yun-fat, Gong Li, and the other actors. Chou portrayed Prince Jai, the ambitious second eldest prince and general of the Imperial army whose personality epitomizes Xiao (孝), the Chinese virtue of filial piety. In this internationally released film, North American audiences saw Chou for the first time. According to Chinese movie critics, comments about his acting ranged from "lacks complexity" to "acceptable," but was critically praised by Western reviewers. His performance in Curse of the Golden Flower was nominated Best Supporting Actor in the Hong Kong Film Awards. In the 2008 film Kung Fu Dunk, Chou portrayed a kung fu student and dunking prodigy, and the film earned over ¥100 million (US$14.7 million).

Chou portrayed 青蜂侠 Kato in The Green Hornet, directed by Michel Gondry and released in January 2011, after Hong Kong actor Stephen Chow withdrew from the project; the film grossed over $228 million worldwide. MTV Networks' NextMovie.com named him one of the "Breakout Stars to Watch for in 2011".

In May 2011, Chou started filming for a new movie, The Viral Factor directed by Dante Lam and starred various well known artistes such as Nicholas Tse. The movie was released in theatres over Asia on 17 January 2012. With most of the scenes shot in the Middle Eastern and Southeast Asian countries, earlier filming process has been slightly disrupted due to political conflicts in the Middle East.

Chou co-starred with Daniel Radcliffe in Now You See Me 2, which was released in June 2016.

In 2018, it was announced that Chou joined the cast of Vin Diesel's fourth XXX film.

In 2021, Chou was briefly starred in Nezha, where he was the executive producer for the film. With a budget reportedly up to more than 400 million yuan ($61.8 million), the film used some expensive racing cars for the action sequences, accounting for about 80% of the entire content. Directed by Chen Yi-xian, the film also stars Tsao Yu-ning, Van Fan, and Alan Kuo. Chou and pop idol Wang Junkai show up in the film in cameo appearances.

Directing 

Chou acquired his first directing experience in 2004 through music videos. He initially experimented with a song by the group Nan Quan Mama titled "Home" where he was involved throughout the entire process from research to editing. After learning the difficulties of being a director, he refused to direct again even at the request of his record company. However, his interest resurfaced again as he directed music videos for 4 of the 12 songs in own album November's Chopin in 2005, and later television advertisements. By 2006, he had taken responsibility for the storyboard, directing, and editing of music videos for all his songs. It is unclear how the public appraises his work, since music videos are rarely the subject of critical review; however, director Zhang Yimou said that Chou's directing abilities may surpass his own in the future, after viewing several of Chou's music videos.

In February 2007, Chou began directing his first film Secret. The script written by Chou was inspired by his relationship with a high school girlfriend, with a plot focused on music, love, and family. He stars as the lead actor of the film with Gwei Lun-mei as the female lead, and Hong Kong veteran actor Anthony Wong as Chou's father. Despite previous experience in filming music videos, Chou admits that movies are more challenging due to storyline and time constraints. This movie was released in July 2007.

In 2013, Jay Chou released his second directorial film, a musical drama titled 天台爱情The Rooftop. It generated a more muted response compared to his directorial debut, the box office receipts in mainland China, on the other hand were positive.

Other works

Book: Grandeur de D Major
Chou published his first book titled Grandeur de D Major on 25 November 2004. This 200-page book features a prologue written by his family, friends, and co-workers; the main section is a compilation of his personal attitudes, philosophies, and recollections of childhood experiences along with pictures from his music videos, many of which have never been released; and lastly, a list of the artist's major awards, musical and lyrical compositions, and discography. For the usually low-profile singer, this book revealed his personality and convictions that has served as the basis of his musical and public image. He demonstrated a strong appreciation of family values with an especially deep connection with his mother and maternal grandmother. His confidence and dedication towards music is evident as he dedicated 2 out of 7 chapters to music: the current state of the industry, his composition methodology, and the importance of individualism to his success in music. This pride is contrasted against his modesty and self-assessed naïveté about many aspects in life, particularly regarding relationships and marriage.

Endorsements 
Chou has been a spokesperson for popular brands such as Pepsi (2002–2007), Panasonic (2001–2005), Motorola (since 2006), M-Zone/China Mobile (since 2003), Levi's (2004–2005), Deerhui (sporting goods, since 2003), Metersbonwe Group (casual wear, since 2003), Colgate (2004–2005), popular computer game Warcraft III: Reign of Chaos (2002), and science and nature magazine National Geographic (2005). To maximize the celebrity branding effect, advertisements are nearly always linked to his music and TV commercials are occasionally directed by him. He acted as the tourism ambassador for Malaysia in 2003. In April 2008, Jay signed with Sprite and collaborated with artistes such as Angela Chang and JJ Lin in commercials. He also did a Sprite commercial with Kobe Bryant and specially wrote a song named "天地一鬥 (Battle of the Incomparable)" featuring Kobe Bryant for the commercial. In June 2011, Jay expanded his area of endorsement into the field of technology, becoming the designer and spokesperson of the "N43SL Jay Chou Edition" laptop of ASUS Computers. The laptop is most notable for its lid design, sound system, start-up and shut-down tones, and a unique "J" font for its key. All of which, except for the sound system, are designed and composed by Jay himself. In 2015, Jay endorses Luxgen.

Philanthropy 
Jay has been the spokesperson for "Angel Heart Foundation" since 2012, a non-profit charity for children with intellectual disability. In 2013, he hosted a voluntary concert for them.

In 2014, Jay accepted the Ice Bucket Challenge from Andy Lau, and also donated NT$100,000 to Taiwanese ALS Foundation, and also donated NT$2 million in the aftermath of 2014 Kaohsiung gas explosions. He also attended the charity event from Fubon Charity Foundation, and 
has been the ambassador for the charity, which helps school children with disabilities, hardship or giving children living in poverty a scholarship for their education.  He had already donated NT$970 million in the last 5 years, sponsoring over 300 of the thousand benefactors, and would extend the offer by 5 years, and opened 300 more scholarships, and donated a lump sum of NT$10.8 million in the next 5 years worth NT$2.16 million each year. In June, 2014, he also went on tour with Will Liu to visit many schoolchildren in remote areas of Taiwan. Jay's second tour is scheduled in August 2015, two months after he officially became the spokesperson for the scholarship plan.

J Gaming 
In 2016, Jay Chou bought the eSports (League of Legends) team Taipei Assassins and renamed it J Gaming. Chou only serves as an investor and owner, and despite holding the title of a 'captain/leader', he will only play in celebrity matches, and would not involve in the day-to-day operating and coaching of the team.

In 2017, Jay Chou spent about 18 million RMB to build a Jay eSports building in 深圳 Shenzhen, which provided updated computer devices and the streaming areas for eSports players in China. More importantly, Jay decides to hold more and more eSports events in the Jay eSports building, which is helpful for the development of eSport industry in China.

Media and public relations

Public image 
Despite living under continual media scrutiny, Chou's public image has changed little over the years as he emphasizes individuality as his "personal philosophy". In his music, this is also evident as he fuses Chinese and Western styles and explores topics unconventional for a pop singer, which have been described as "authentic" and "revolutionary". The media describes a hard-working perfectionist with clear self-direction who is occasionally regarded as competitive and a "control freak". There is a misunderstanding about his nickname "President Chou", used by both the press and fans to underscore his domineering personality and impact on Asian music, but also points at his musical talent. It also points to the fact that he is the CEO, spokesperson and chairperson of his many business ventures like clothing lines and his own talent agency (JVR Music). Yet the origin of this nickname emerges from his fever of collecting antiques as the word "董" comes from "antique" in Chinese (古董), and according to JJ Lin, they both like to collect and drive antique cars (古董車). When he initiated Nan Quan Mama (南拳媽媽), it was also based on his pen name in his high school years, and the band's name was also dedicated to his mother. In fact, Nanquan is an actual style of martial arts from south of the Yangtze River.  As Jay was influenced by action movies, he also wrote songs about martial arts, even when he had no formal training in any martial arts discipline. Outside of music, Chou is reported as shy, quiet, modest, and views filial piety as "the most important thing". In line with his aim to present a positive image, he is a non-smoker and non-drinker and does not go to nightclubs. Government officials and educators in Asia have awarded him for his exemplary behaviour, designated him a spokesperson in the youth-empowerment project "Young Voice" in 2005 and an anti-depression campaign in 2007. His lyrics for two songs have been incorporated into the school syllabus to inspire motivational and filial attitudes. In November 2007, Chou was criticized by some for attending the funeral of Taiwanese gang leader Chen Chi-li to console Chen's son Baron Chen, whom Chou met while filming Kung Fu Dunk. In 2011 Chou performed on the New Year's Gala program on China's Central Television.

Response to the news media and paparazzi 
As with other stars, Chou has expressed a strong dislike of the paparazzi. In the early years of his career, unwanted attention by the media was usually dealt with by avoidance. In-line with his quiet nature, he frequently wore baseball caps and hoods while lowering his head and evading eye contact during interviews. In recent years however, he has been less passive about the invasion of his privacy. To discourage the paparazzi from taking unsolicited pictures, Chou is known to photograph the paparazzi that follow him. He openly calls the paparazzi "dogs" and tabloids "dog magazines", as shown in his lyrics for Besieged From All Sides. The media have also accused Chou of evading compulsory military service by feigning to suffer from ankylosing spondylitis. Later that year he was acquitted after providing the relevant medical records and letters from the army confirming a lawful exemption from draft dated before the start of his music career.

Despite constant harassment and stalking by the media, he does acknowledge that not all media attention is unwelcome. Coverage by international journals and news agencies such as Time, The Guardian, and Reuters help ascertain his influence on mainstream culture. An editorial written by Kerry Brown of Chatham House named Chou as one of China's 50 most influential figures in 21st century, one of only three singers on a list dominated by politicians and corporate owners.
At the end of 2009, he was included on JWT's annual list of 100 Things to Watch in 2010.

Fanbase 

It is difficult to estimate the size and global spread of Chou's fanbase. Jay's fanbase originated from Taiwan and grew extensively to other Mandarin-speaking regions. The Chinese-speaking populations of China, Hong Kong, Macau, Singapore, and Malaysia make up a significant percentage of Chou's fans. Despite rampant piracy issues in this region of Asia, particularly in China, every album Chou has released so far has surpassed 2 million sales. According to Baidu, the most popular internet search engine in China, Chou is the number one searched male artist in 2002, 05, 06 and 07.

Currently, Chou remains largely unknown outside of Asia, except in cities with large Chinese speaking immigrant populations such as Los Angeles, New York, San Francisco, Seattle, Vancouver, Toronto, Sydney, Melbourne, Adelaide and Brisbane. He has held concerts in major venues such as the Acer Arena (Sydney – 3 July 2009), HP Pavilion at San Jose (San Jose – 31 December 2010), Los Angeles Memorial Sports Arena (Los Angeles – 8 January 2011), MGM Grand (Las Vegas – 25 December 2002), Rogers Arena (Vancouver – 23 December 2010), Shrine Auditorium (Los Angeles – 18 December 2004), Galen Center (Los Angeles – 24 December 2007), the Air Canada Centre (Toronto – 18 December 2008), and Wembley Arena (London – 17–18 March 2017). His intention to increase his prominence in the Western world beyond Chinese audiences is clear. In 2006, Chou composed and sang the theme song for Fearless, a movie released in major theatres in most English-speaking countries, though the impact to his fame has been minimal. His role in Curse of the Golden Flower (limited release) marks his acting debut in North America. Despite having a supporting but important role in the story's plot, the North American version of the official posters only featured a view of his back, greatly contrasting the Asian versions where his face and name were clear and placed between the leading actor and actress. Although Chou is still far from being well known to English audiences, this movie has brought him international exposure. Chou gained further exposure to western audiences in his starring role as crimefighter Kato in January 2011's The Green Hornet.

Personal life 
Chou was rumored to have a relationship with Taiwanese singer Jolin Tsai with the former being featured on Tsai's song "Can't Speak Clearly", which appeared on her fourth studio album Lucky Number (2001). 

In December 2001, Tsai and Chou were first spotted dining at an izakaya in Shinjuku, Japan. Although they did not admit to their relationship, their romance was an open secret in those years. 

In February 2005, Chou was spotted shopping intimately with Taiwanese news presenter Patty Hou in Shibuya, Japan. After that, Tsai deliberately avoided meeting Chou and Hou during public events. 

In June 2010, Tsai and Chou finally made amends, and Tsai appeared as a special guest at Chou's concert in Taipei, which shocked the public. 

In July 2013, when being interviewed by Taiwanese TV host Matilda Tao, for the first time, Tsai admitted she used to be in love with Chou, and that she broke up with him after he cheated on her. 

In November 2014, Chou confirmed his relationship with model Hannah Quinlivan. The pair had been dating since 2010, but Hannah first met Jay when she was 14 and had been working as his employee as a clothing shop assistant since 2007. 

The couple married on 17 January, 2015, one day before Chou's birthday. A separate private wedding ceremony open to friends and family occurred on 9 February in Taipei. A third reception, this time in Australia, was held in March. According to Chou's official Facebook page, the couple has been registered for marriage since July 2014. 

The couple has three children: daughter Hathaway (born July 2015), son Romeo (born June 2017),  and Jacinda (born May 2022).

Religious beliefs 
Jay Chou became an Evangelical Protestant Christian as his wife, his mother and some of his friends, including Will Liu and Vanness Wu, are Protestants. In 2012, he was baptised.

Discography 

 Jay (2000)
 Fantasy (2001)
 The Eight Dimensions (2002)
 Ye Hui Mei (2003)
 Common Jasmin Orange (2004)
 November's Chopin (2005)
 Still Fantasy (2006)
 On the Run! (2007)
 Capricorn (2008)
 The Era (2010)
 Wow! (2011)
 Opus 12 (2012)
 Aiyo, Not Bad (2014)
 Jay Chou's Bedtime Stories (2016)
 Greatest Works of Art (2022)

Filmography

Film

Television series

Television shows

Adapted musical

Accolades 

From the launch of his music career in 2000, Chou has won  singer-songwriter and  producer awards in Asia. The highly coveted Golden Melody Awards in Taiwan  awarded "Best Album" for his debut CD Jay (2000) in 2001, and five awards (including "Best Album", "Best Composer", and "Best Producer") in the following year for the album Fantasy (2001). However, failure to win "Best Album" for three consecutive years has left him disheartened with award ceremonies. Although he continues to win more than 20 awards per year from various organizations in Asia, Chou has stated he will rely more on album sales as an indicator of his music's quality and popularity. In 2004, 2006, 2007 and 2008, he was awarded Best-Selling Chinese Artist by World Music Awards for the albums Common Jasmin Orange, 依然范特西 Still Fantasy and On the Run.

Jay Chou scored strong radio and video airplay in Italy with his track "Nunchucks", in 2002

Chou dominated the 12th annual Channel V Music Awards ceremony, which was held 11 January 2006 at Queen Elizabeth Stadium in Hong Kong. In the Taiwan/Hong Kong category, the Sony BMG Hong Kong-signed artist was named best male singer, most popular male singer and best singer/songwriter. Chou also collected the best music video award and received one of the best song of the year awards, both for "Night Song."

Taiwanese vocalist Jay Chou was named the best Asian artist at the eighth annual CCTV/MTV Music Awards, held 12 October 2006 at the Beijing Exhibition Centre Auditorium.

Five Chinese musicians gained exposure for their participation in events associated with the 2008 Olympic Games in Beijing, China, including Jay Chou.

Chou won the Favorite Male Artist of the 20th Golden Melody Awards in Taiwan. He did not attend the event to collect the award as he was on tour in China at the time.

Enterprises 
J Team
JVR Music

See also 
 Forbes China Celebrity 100
 Honorific nicknames in popular music
 List of best-selling albums in Taiwan

Notes 

 a. Examples of Chou's Chinese style R&B: "East Wind Breaks" (東風破), "Hair Like Snow" (髮如雪), "Faraway" (千里之外). Examples of Chinese style rock: "Nunchucks" (雙截棍), "Dragon Fist" (龍拳), "Golden Armor" (黃金甲).
 b. Examples of sound effects used in Chou's music: ping pong balls in "Class2 Grade3" (三年二班), touch-tone phone dialing in "Blue Storm" (藍色風暴), helicopter blades in "My Territory" (我的地盤), dripping rain in "You Can Hear" (妳聽得到), and radio static noise in "Nocturne" (夜曲).
 c. Examples of Oriental-style lyrics by Vincent Fang: "Shanghai 1943" (上海一九四三), "Wife" (娘子), and "Chrysanthemum Flower Platform" (菊花台).
 d. Examples of romantic lyrics by Vincent Fang: "Love Before Anno Domini" (愛在西元前), "Nocturne" (夜曲), "Common Jasmin Orange" (七里香), and "Perfectionist" (完美主義).
 e. Vincent Fang's lyrics discuss war in "The Last Campaign" (最後的戰役) and "Wounds That End War" (止戰之殤), the Bible in "Blue Storm" (藍色風暴), sports in "Bullfight" (鬥牛) and "Class2 Grade3" (三年二班), and martial arts in "Nunchucks" (雙截棍) and "Ninja" (忍者).
 f. Examples of Vivian Hsu's work: "Adorable Woman" (可愛女人), "Tornado" (龍捲風), and "Simple Love" (簡單愛).
 g. Examples of romantic lyrics by Jay Chou: "Black Humor" (黑色幽默), "Silence" (安靜), "Iron Box of an Peninsula" (半島鐵盒), "Fine Day" (晴天), "Excuse" (藉口), "Black Sweater" (黑色毛衣), and "White Windmills" (白色風車).
 h. "Snail" (蝸牛) and "Listen To Mother's Words" (聽媽媽的話).
 i. Golden Melody Awards: "...the Chinese pop music industry's equivalent of the Grammy Awards in the US are held annually to award professionals making music in Mandarin, Taiwanese, Hakka and any of Taiwan's Aboriginal languages."
 j. A similar book was published in Japanese, titled Grandeur de D major – Jay Chou Photo Essay.

References

External links 

Jay Chou at JVR Music 

 
1979 births
Living people
Musicians from Taipei
Businesspeople from Taipei
Converts to Christianity
Hokkien singers
Taiwanese people of Hoklo descent
21st-century Taiwanese male actors
21st-century Taiwanese male singers
People from New Taipei
Sony BMG artists
Taiwanese Christians
Taiwanese film directors
Taiwanese idols
Taiwanese male film actors
Taiwanese male singer-songwriters
Taiwanese television personalities
Taiwanese Mandopop singer-songwriters
Tenors